Priest is a populated place located one mile southwest of Big Oak Flat in Tuolumne County, California.  It is the eastern terminus of the New Priest Grade and the Old Priest Grade.

References

Unincorporated communities in Tuolumne County, California
Unincorporated communities in California